Crenella may refer to

Crenella (bivalve), a genus of mollusc in the family Mytilidae
RFA Crenella, a Royal Fleet Auxiliary tanker in service 1916-19
, the above ship sold into merchant service, in service 1919-23